Tom Scott may refer to:

Arts and entertainment
 Tom Scott (saxophonist) (born 1948), jazz saxophonist
 Tom Scott (composer) (1912–1961), American composer
 Tom Scott (painter) (1854–1927), Scottish water-colourist
 Tom Scott (poet) (1918–1995), Scottish poet
 Tom Scott (cartoonist) (born 1947), New Zealand cartoonist
 Tom Everett Scott (born 1970), American film, theatre and television actor
 Tom Scott (presenter), British YouTuber and presenter
 Tom Scott (sound engineer), shared the Academy Award for Best Sound in 1983 and 1984
 Tom Scott (rapper) (born 1984), New Zealand rapper

Sports
 Tom Scott (rugby union, born 1870) (1870–1930), Scotland international rugby union player
 Tom Scott (rugby union, born 1875) (1875–1947), Scotland international rugby union player
 Tom Scott (coach) (1908–1993), coach of the North Carolina Tar Heels basketball program
 Tom Scott (footballer) (1904–1979), English footballer
 Tom Scott (linebacker) (1930–2015), member of the College Football Hall of Fame
 Tom Scott (offensive lineman) (born 1970), American football offensive lineman
 Tom Scott (Canadian football) (born 1951), member of the Canadian Football Hall of Fame

Others
 Tom Scott (businessman) (born 1966), founded Nantucket Nectars
 Tom Scott (politician) (born 1958), member of the Connecticut Senate

See also
 Thomas Scott (disambiguation)
 Tommy Scott (disambiguation)